Jayney Miriam Klimek (born 18 August 1962 in Melbourne, Australia), is a Berlin-based Australian-born singer-songwriter.

Early years 
Jayney Miriam Klimek was born on 18 August 1962 and grew up in Melbourne. Her father, Alfons Klimek, and mother, Luisa née Cester (born January 29, 1916) had eight children: Eugenia, Lydia, Naomi, Greta, Alfons junior (born February 1956), Robert, and Jayney and her twin brother, Johnny. Johnny is a successful Hollywood composer. Their cousins Nic Cester and Chris Cester are founding mainstays of Australian hard rockers, Jet. Klimek studied classical singing and acting at the National Theatre, Melbourne and at John Gauci School of Film. In 1984 she relocated to Berlin to join her two brothers, Alf and Johnny, where they had formed The Other Ones with three local musicians.

Music career
Jayney achieved chart success with The Other Ones. "Holiday" spent 20 weeks in the European Top Ten.

Collaborations include work with Tony Banks on two of his solo albums Bankstatement and Still, Tangerine Dream (vocal arrangements for songs "Chasing The Bad Seed", "All The Steps To Heaven" and "Blinded By The World's Desire" for the album Purgatorio and vocals on Inferno), Paul van Dyk, Alphaville, the French band from Bordeaux XII Alfonso.
Jayney co-wrote and performed lead vocals on Digital Tenderness Terranova.

In 2005 she formed You Pretty Thing with Andreas Schwarz-Ruszczynski.
Their Single "Push It" has become the longest running No.1 played track on RadioEins.

In 2014 she released her first solo album "Awake" on Inflatable Records. The album was recorded in Berlin and London and produced by Gareth Jones (Depeche Mode, Erasure, Einstürzende Neubauten).

Film career
In 2016 Jayney made her acting debut in the Austrian film :de:Hotel Rock’n’Roll.

Discography  
 1989 : Bankstatement from Tony Banks - Vocals on Queen of Darkness, That Night and A House Needs a Roof
 1991 : Still from Tony Banks - Vocals on Water Out of Wine and Back to Back 1995 : Divamania (Berlin's Best Women In The House) Various artists - On Fly 2001 : Der Kleine Eisbär - Der Soundtrack Zum Kinofilm Various artists - On Lonely 2002 : Inferno from Tangerine Dream - Alto vocals 
 2004 : Purgatorio from Tangerine Dream - Vocal arrangements 
 2014 : Awake'' as herself

References
 Jayney Klimek official website
 Inflatable Records

1962 births
Living people
Singers from Melbourne
Australian women singers
Australian expatriates in Germany